The Coward (Spanish: La cobarde) is a 1953 Mexican drama film directed by Julio Bracho and starring Irasema Dilián, Ernesto Alonso and Carlos Navarro.

Cast
 Irasema Dilián as Mara  
 Ernesto Alonso as Arturo  
 Carlos Navarro as Roberto
 Carlos Agostí as Julio  
 Andrea Palma as Irene, hermana de Arturo  
 Giuseppe Di Stefano as Cantante  
 Angélica María as Mara, niña 
 Marina Herrera as Lupita, criada
 Héctor Mateos as Comisario
 Ángel Merino as Marino
 Daniel Arroyo as Invitado a boda
 Alejandro Ciangherotti as Roberto, niño  
 Enrique Díaz Indiano as Doctor Arriaga
 Ana María Hernández as Invitada a boda
 Cecilia Leger as Invitada a fiesta
 Fernando Luján as Julio, niño

References

Bibliography 
 María Luisa Amador. Cartelera cinematográfica, 1950-1959. UNAM, 1985.

External links 
 

1953 films
1953 drama films
Mexican drama films
1950s Spanish-language films
Films directed by Julio Bracho
Mexican black-and-white films
1950s Mexican films